Barh was a Lok Sabha constituency in Bihar from 1977 to 2004.

Bihar's future CM Nitish Kumar was elected five times from Barh (बाढ़), from 1989 to 1999. He lost from Barh in 2004 but won that year from Nalanda. Tarkeshwari Sinha was another prominent politician from Bihar to have represented this seat.

Members of Lok Sabha
1952: Seat did not exist 
1957: Tarkeshwari Sinha, Indian National Congress
1962: Tarkeshwari Sinha, Indian National Congress
1967: Tarkeshwari Sinha, Indian National Congress
1971: Dharam Bir Sinha, Indian National Congress
1977: Shyam Sundar Gupta, Janata Party
1980: Dharam Bir Sinha, Indian National Congress (Urs)
1984: Prakash Chandra Yadav, Indian National Congress
1989: Nitish Kumar, Janata Dal
1991: Nitish Kumar, Janata Dal
1996: Nitish Kumar, Samata Party
1998: Nitish Kumar, Samata Party
1999: Nitish Kumar, Janata Dal (United)
2004: Vijay Krishna, Rashtriya Janata Dal
2008: onwards:'' See Patna Sahib

Election results

1996 Election
 Nitish Kumar (SAP) : 360,156 votes  
 Vijay Krishna (JD) : 295,302

2004 Election

See also
 List of Constituencies of the Lok Sabha

References

Former Lok Sabha constituencies of Bihar
Former constituencies of the Lok Sabha
2008 disestablishments in India
Constituencies disestablished in 2008